A Casa (English: The House) is a Brazilian reality competition based on the Dutch television series Get The F*ck Out Of My House, hosted by Marcos Mion. The series premiered on Tuesday, June 27, 2017, at 10:30 p.m. on RecordTV.

The show features a group of 100 complete strangers, known as HouseGuests,  cram into an average sized family home in the bid to become the last person standing and win a jackpot prize, while being continuously watched by television cameras.

Filming began in São Paulo on June 2 and lasted until July 4, 2017. The season finale aired live on September 5, 2017, where college student Thais Guerra won the competition with 66.96% of the public vote over personal trainer Isa Elguesabal and took home the jackpot prize of R$436.772.

Cast

HouseGuests
The contestants were officially revealed by RecordTV on June 27, 2017, at 12:30 p.m.

Future Appearances
After this series, in 2017, Monick Camargo (64) appeared in A Fazenda 9, she finished in 4th place in the competition.

In 2018, Mauricio Miguel (42) and Vini Büttel (99) appeared in De Férias com o Ex 3 as original cast, Luiza Aragão (63) also appeared as an ex.

In 2022, Alex Gallete (77) and Vini Büttel (99) appeared in A Fazenda 14. Vini finished in 14th place, while Alex finished in 12th place.

The game
Key

Prize challenge

Panels' results

Notes

Elimination table
Key

Notes

Spin-offs

A Casa Online
An online spin-off show titled A Casa Online is presented by Rafael Calixto. The show is broadcast live on Facebook after every episode and is also available on-demand via R7 Play. It features interviews with special guests and exclusive content across social media sites like YouTube.

Ratings and reception

Brazilian ratings
All numbers are in points and provided by Kantar Ibope Media.

References

External links
 A Casa on R7.com

2017 Brazilian television series debuts
2017 Brazilian television seasons
Brazilian reality television series
RecordTV original programming